The Slipper 17 is an American trailerable sailboat that was designed by Nick Hake as a pocket cruiser and first built in 1981.

The Slipper 17 design was developed into the Seaward Fox in 1993.

Production
The design was built by the Starboard Yacht Company in the United States from 1981 until 1991, but it is now out of production. The company and production was later taken over by Hake Yachts.

Design
The Slipper 17 is a recreational keelboat, built predominantly of fiberglass, with wood trim. It has a fractional sloop rig or optional catboat rig, a nearly plumb stem, a slightly angled transom, a transom-hung rudder controlled by a tiller and a fixed shoal draft fin keel or keel and centerboard. It displaces  and carries  of ballast.

The boat is normally fitted with a small  outboard motor for docking and maneuvering.

The design has sleeping accommodation for four people, with a double "V"-berth in the bow cabin and two straight settee berths in the main cabin. The galley is located on both sides just aft of the bow cabin. The galley is equipped with a sink to port. The head is located in the bow cabin, centered aft, under the "V"-berth.

Operational history
In a 2010 review Steve Henkel wrote, "Nick Hake started Starboard Yacht Company in 1979 with the cute little Slipper 17. Over the years the dimensions varied a bit, and so did the rig (cat or sloop), the deck configuration (deckhouse or flush deck) and the name of the builder (Starboard, Seaward, Hake Yachts) but with Nick Hake always in control ... Best features: Relatively wide beam gives her more space inside compared to her comp[etitor]s. She was available over the years in several different layouts, including two-berth, three-berth, and ... four-berth model ... (Two berths is probably the maximum most sailors would want to try, except for those with very small children.) Worst features: The early models had a rudder with too little area for quick manueverability ... Shallow draft, whether in the plain keel model (1' 7" draft, shown here) or the centerboarder, is insufficient for good upwind performance. Sail area is on the low side ..."

See also
List of sailing boat types

References

Keelboats
1980s sailboat type designs
Sailing yachts 
Trailer sailers
Sailboat type designs by Nick Hake
Sailboat types built by Hake Yachts